Coope is a surname. Notable people with the surname include:

Miles Coope (1916–1974), English cricketer
Octavius Coope (1814–1886), English politician
Russell Coope (1930–2011), British palaeontologist
Ursula Coope, British philosopher

See also
Coop (disambiguation)
Coopes, a surname
 Coops, a surname
 Coop (surname)
 Cooper (surname)